This page lists the most recent (direct) national elections in African countries.

Algeria
 Presidential: 12 December 2019
 People's National Assembly: 12 June 2021

Angola
 Presidential: 24 August 2022
 National Assembly: 24 August 2022

Benin
 Presidential: 11 April 2021
 National Assembly: 28 April 2019

Botswana
 Presidential: 23 October 2019
 National Assembly: 23 October 2019

Burkina Faso

 Presidential: 22 November 2020
 National Assembly: 22 November 2020

Burundi

 Presidential: 20 May 2020
 National Assembly: 20 May 2020
 Constitutional Referendum: 17 May 2018

Cameroon

 Presidential: 7 October 2018
 National Assembly: 9 February 2020

Cape Verde

 Presidential: 17 October 2021
 National Assembly: 20 March 2016

Central African Republic

 Presidential: 30 December 2015 and 14 February 2016
 National Assembly: 14 February and 31 March 2016

Chad

 Presidential: 10 April 2016
 National Assembly: 13 February 2011
 Constitutional Referendum: 6 June 2005

Comoros

 Presidential: 24 March 2019
 Assembly of the Union: 19 January and 23 February 2020

Côte d'Ivoire

Presidential 25 October 2015
National Assembly: 18 December 2016

Democratic Republic of the Congo

 Presidential: 30 December 2018
 National Assembly: 30 December 2018

Djibouti

 Presidential: 8 April 2016
 National Assembly: 23 February 2018

Egypt

Presidential: 26–28 March 2018
 People's Assembly: 17 October – 2 December 2015 (three stages)
 Constitutional Referendum: 20–22 April 2019

Equatorial Guinea

 Presidential: 24 April 2016
 House of People's Representatives: 12 November 2017

Eritrea

Eritrea, since independence, has repeatedly postponed elections.

Ethiopia

 Presidential: 25 October 2018
 House of People's Representatives: 24 May 2015

Gabon

 Presidential: 27 August 2016
 National Assembly: 6 and 27 October 2018

The Gambia

 Presidential: 1 December 2016
 National Assembly: 6 April 2017

Ghana

 Presidential: 7 December 2016
 Parliamentary: 7 December 2016

Guinea

 Presidential: 11 October 2015
National Assembly 22 March 2020
Constitutional Referendum 22 March 2020

Guinea-Bissau
 Presidential: 24 November and 29 December 2019
 People's National Assembly: 10 March 2019

Kenya

 Presidential: 26 October 2017
 National Assembly: 8 August 2017
 Constitutional Referendum: 4 August 2010

Lesotho
 National Assembly: 3 June 2017

Liberia
 Presidential: 10 October and 26 December 2017
 Senate: 10 October 2017
 House of Representatives: 10 October 2017

Libya
Libya does not hold elections.

Madagascar
 Presidential: 7 November and 19 December 2018
 National Assembly: 27 May 2019
 Constitutional Referendum: 17 November 2010

Malawi

 Presidential: 21 May 2019
 National Assembly: 21 May 2019

Mali

 Presidential: 29 July and 12 August 2018
National Assembly: 29 March and 19 April 2020

Mauritania

 Presidential: 22 June 2019
 National Assembly: 1 and 15 September 2018

Mauritius

 National Assembly: 7 November 2019

Morocco
 Chamber of Representatives: 7 October 2016

Mozambique
 Presidential: 15 October 2019
 National Assembly: 15 October 2019

Namibia

 Presidential: 27 November 2019
 National Assembly: 27 November 2019

Niger

 Presidential: 21 February and 20 March 2016
 Presidential: 21 February 2016

Nigeria

 Presidential: 23–24 February 2019
 Senate: 23–24 February 2019
 House of Representatives: 23–24 February 2019

Republic of Congo

 Presidential: 20 March 2016
 National Assembly: 16 and 30 July 2017

Rwanda
 Presidential: 4 August 2017
 Chamber of Deputies: 3 September 2018

São Tomé and Príncipe
 Presidential: 17 July and 7 August 2016
 National Assembly: 7 October 2018

Senegal

 Presidential: 24 February 2019
 National Assembly: 30 July 2017

Seychelles

 Presidential: 3-5 and 16–18 December 2015
 National Assembly: 8–10 September 2016

Sierra Leone

 Presidential: 7 and 30 March 2018
 House of Representatives: 7 March 2018

Somalia

 Presidential: 8 February 2017
 House of the People: 23 October and 10 November 2016

South Africa

 National Assembly: 8 May 2019

South Sudan

Sudan

 Presidential: 13–16 April 2015
 National Assembly: 13–16 April 2015

Swaziland

 House of Assembly: 18 August and 21 September 2018

Tanzania

 Presidential: 25 October 2015
 National Assembly: 25 October 2015

Togo

Presidential 22 February 2020
 National Assembly: 20 December 2018

Tunisia

 Presidential: 15 September and 13 October 2019
 Chamber of Deputies: 6 October 2019

Uganda

 Presidential: 18 February 2016
 Parliament: 18 February 2016
 Presidential: 14 January 2021

Western Sahara
 National Council: 19–21 February 2012

Zambia

 Presidential: 11 August 2016
 National Assembly: 11 August 2016

Zimbabwe

 Presidential: 30 July 2018
 National Assembly: 30 July 2018

Summary

See also

 Africa
 Elections
 Electoral calendar
 List of national legislatures

References

External links
 Webdossier on elections in Africa

 
Politics of Africa